Sir Nicholas Morice, 2nd Baronet (1681–1726) of Werrington Park (then in Devon but now in Cornwall) was an English politician who sat in the English and British House of Commons from 1702 to 1726.

Early life

Morice was the eldest surviving son of Sir William Morice, 1st Baronet, MP for Newport, Cornwall and his second wife Elizabeth Reynell, daughter of Richard Reynell of Ogwell Devon. He succeeded his father in the baronetcy in 1690. He matriculated at Exeter College, Oxford on 14 April 1698, aged 17. By a licence dated 21 March 1704, he married Lady Catherine Herbert, the daughter of Thomas Herbert, 8th Earl of Pembroke.

Career
Morice was returned as Member of Parliament for Newport, at the English general elections of 1702 and 1705 and at the British general elections of 1708, 1710 and 1713. He was returned at the 1715 general election as a Tory and consistently opposed the Administration. He was returned again at the 1722 general election.

Death and legacy
Morice died on 27 January 1726. With his wife, he had a son and two daughters. He was succeeded to the baronetcy and Werrington Park by his son Sir William Morice, 3rd Baronet.

References

1681 births
1726 deaths
Politicians from Devon
Baronets in the Baronetage of England
Alumni of Exeter College, Oxford
Members of the pre-1707 English Parliament for constituencies in Cornwall
English MPs 1702–1705
English MPs 1705–1707
Members of the Parliament of Great Britain for constituencies in Cornwall
British MPs 1707–1708
British MPs 1708–1710
British MPs 1710–1713
British MPs 1713–1715
British MPs 1715–1722
British MPs 1722–1727